The 2021 Israel Super Cup is the 26th edition of the Israel Super Cup (31st, including unofficial matches), an annual Israel football match played between the winners of the previous season's Top Division and the Israel State Cup. This will be the seventh edition since the Super cup's resumption in 2015.

The game will be played on 25 July 2021 between the 2020–21 Israeli Premier League champions, Maccabi Haifa, and the 2020–21 Israel State Cup winners, Maccabi Tel Aviv.

Match details

Notes

References

2021–22 in Israeli football
Israel Super Cup
Israel Super Cup matches
Super Cup 2021
Super Cup 2021
July 2021 sports events in Asia